Zoop in India is a 2006 Dutch family film. It is a sequel to Zoop in Africa (2005) and is followed by Zoop in South America (2007).

The film received a Golden Film award in 2006 for selling 100,000 cinema tickets in the Netherlands.

External links

2006 films
2000s children's comedy films
Dutch comedy films
Dutch children's films
2000s Dutch-language films
Films based on television series
Films set in India
Dutch sequel films
2006 comedy films
Films directed by Johan Nijenhuis